The Estonia men's national floorball team is the national floorball team of Estonia, and a member of the International Floorball Federation. Estonia has competed in 7 out of 12 World Championships (1996, 2008, 2010, 2012, 2014, 2016 and 2018). Their best result is 7th place in 2010.

Players

Current roster
Roster for the 2020 WFC Qualifiers:

World Championships

References

External links
 

National sports teams of Estonia
Estonia
Floorball in Estonia